Jack Fletcher is an American voice actor, casting director, writer and voice director. He has done voice acting and directing for anime and video games. He has been the English voice director for the Sonic the Hedgehog series, starting with Sonic Free Riders. He also acted in the English dubbing adaptations of Hayao Miyazaki's films until he was replaced by John Lasseter. Fletcher has done additional work as a theater director and teacher. He has spent a number of years teaching and directing at the American Conservatory Theater in San Francisco, as well as at many other theaters.

Voice-acting roles
Æon Flux (U.S. TV)
Asterix and the Vikings – Pirate Captain, Fotograf, Caraf
Final Fantasy X-2 – Garik
Final Fantasy: Spirits Within
 Happily N'Ever After – Additional Voices
Hurricane Polymar: Holy Blood – Onigawara / Skamugu
The Animatrix: Beyond (OAV)
The Animatrix: Matriculated (OAV) – Sandro
Thru the Moebius Strip – Soldier
Ninja Scroll: The Series – Anden Yamidoro
Pet Shop of Horrors (TV) – Liu Tai Wei / Police Captain
Princess Mononoke - Additional Voices
Psycho Diver: Soul Siren (OAV)
Tenchi Muyo! Ryo-Ohki – D3 (OVA 2)
Tenchi Muyo! The Night Before The Carnival – Kamidake
Twilight of the Dark Master – Eiji Kuraza
Valkyria Chronicles – Additional Voices
Vampire Hunter D: Bloodlust – Grove

Voice direction credits

24: The Game
Æon Flux
Armored Core 4
Biohunter
Castle in the Sky
Celebrity Deathmatch (2006–2007)
Dead or Alive Xtreme 2
Dead or Alive Paradise
Dragon Slayer
Final Fantasy: Legend of the Crystals
Final Fantasy: The Spirits Within
Final Fantasy X
Final Fantasy X-2
Final Fantasy XII
Final Fantasy XIII
Final Fantasy XIII-2
Final Fantasy Tactics: The War of the Lions
The First Men on the Moon
Golgo 13: Queen Bee
Hurricane Polymar: Holy Blood
Kiki's Delivery Service
Legend of the Three Caballeros
Looney Tunes Cartoons
MadWorld
Magical Girl Pretty Sammy
My Gym Partner's a Monkey
Ninja Gaiden II
Ninja Gaiden Sigma 2
Ninja Scroll: The Series
Pet Shop of Horrors
Princess Mononoke
Project Sylpheed
Psycho Diver
Reign: The Conqueror: Episode 1 to 4
Resonance of Fate
Rise of Nightmares
Sonic the Hedgehog series (2010–present)
Sonic Boom
Spawn: The Animated Series
Splatterhouse
Tekkaman Blade II
Tenchi Muyo! Mihoshi Special
Tenchi Muyo! Ryo-Ohki (OAV)
Tenchi Muyo!' The Night Before The Carnival (OAV)
Tenchi Universe
The Animatrix (all segments)
The Chronicles of Riddick: Dark Fury
The Powerpuff Girls
Twilight of the Dark Master
Valkyria Chronicles
Valkyria Chronicles II
Vampire Hunter D: Bloodlust
Van Helsing: The London Assignment
Yakuza

External links

References

Year of birth missing (living people)
Place of birth missing (living people)
Living people
American theatre directors
American casting directors
American voice directors
American male voice actors